Moneilema gigas is a large, flightless, black beetle native to the Sonoran desert at elevations below 1500 metres.  The front wings are fused forming a single, hardened shell. Collectively - with 19 other Moneilema species - M. gigas is also known as the cactus longhorn beetle.

Moneilema gigas normally feeds on chollas and prickly pear cacti, and is known to feed on saguaro seedlings. Larvae bore into cactus roots and stems, sometimes killing more susceptible individuals. Adults also feed on the surface of cacti. M. gigas are most active during mid or late summer - the adults typically emerging during the summer monsoon season.

Like many flightless beetles, these beetles have limited wing musculature with a rounded abdomen and thorax, similar in appearance to a number of other flightless desert beetles. Cactus longhorn beetles resemble and mimic the behavior of noxious stink beetles in the genus Eleodes.

References

External links 
Range expansions in the flightless longhorn cactus beetles
Evolutionary Consequences of Dispersal Ability in Cactus-feeding Insects

Moneilemini
Beetles of North America
Beetles described in 1873